"Maria" is the debut single of German-American boy band US5. It was written by Dashiel Andrews, MM Dollar, Mike Michaels, Sammy Naja, and Jay "TK-Roxx" Khan for their debut studio album Here We Go (2005), while production was helmed by Dollar, Michaels, and Naja. The song peaked at number one on the German Singles Chart and charted within the top 10 in Austria and Switzerland. "Maria" also entered the top 40 of the UK Singles Chart, reaching number 38.

Track listing

Charts

Weekly charts

Year-end charts

References

2005 singles
US5 songs
2005 songs